NELC may refer to:

 Northern Evangelical Lutheran Church
 Near Eastern Languages and Cultures/Civilizations, a name for Middle Eastern studies
 National Environmental Law Center
 National Employment Law Center
 National Equipment Leasing Corporation
 National Electronic Library for Cancers
 Naval Electronics Laboratory Center
 National E-Learning Centre (Egypt)
 National Evangelical Lutheran Church US base church body 1898-1964